Parry Island or Islands may refer to:

Parry Island (Ontario), in Georgian Bay, Ontario, Canada, site of the Wasauksing First Nation
Parry Island (Pacific), part of Enewetak Atoll in the Pacific Ocean and a fighting theatre in World War II
Parry Island, former name of Philip Island (British Columbia)
Parry Islands, former name of the Queen Elizabeth Islands, Canada

See also
Perry Island (disambiguation)